Åke "Bajdoff" Johansson (19 March 1928 – 21 December 2014) was a Swedish football player.

Johansson played as a center half in IFK Norrköping and capped 53 times for the national team between 1955 and 1965. With IFK Norrköping he owns the club record with 321 appearances.

Johansson became Swedish champion with his club 6 times (1952, 1956, 1957, 1960, 1962 and 1963), won Guldbollen 1957 and was a member of the silver winning team in 1958 FIFA World Cup but did not appear in the final. He also capped one time for the national team in ice hockey. He died after a brief illness, on 21 December 2014.

References

External links
More about Åke Johansson by Tomas Junglander(Swedish)

1928 births
1958 FIFA World Cup players
2014 deaths
Allsvenskan players
IFK Norrköping players
Sweden international footballers
Swedish ice hockey players
Swedish footballers
Association football defenders
Sportspeople from Norrköping
Footballers from Östergötland County